The Happy Ending is a 1969 drama film written and directed by Richard Brooks, which tells the story of a repressed housewife who longs for liberation from her husband and daughter. It stars Jean Simmons (who received an Oscar nomination), John Forsythe, Shirley Jones, Lloyd Bridges and Teresa Wright.

Plot
1953: Through the course of a Colorado autumn and winter, Mary Spencer (Jean Simmons) and Fred Wilson (John Forsythe) lead an idyllic existence. Mary drops out of college (with 6 months to go) to marry Fred. Their perfect wedding mirrors the happy endings of the films Mary loves.

1969: It is the Wilson's 16th wedding anniversary. On his way to work, Fred, a successful tax consultant, tells their maid Agnes (Nanette Fabray) that he has found vodka hidden in Mary's wardrobe and asks Agnes to keep an eye on his wife. Mary sets out for the beauty parlour. At an airline office, however, Mary buys a one-way ticket to Nassau, Bahamas, looking for an escape from her dull and unhappy suburban life.

On the flight she recalls the horrors of last year's anniversary party, when Fred drunkenly flirted with a blonde divorcee, and she took refuge in the bottle and a rerun of Casablanca. At a stop-over, she calls home and learns this year's anniversary party has been a different sort of disaster. Her teenage daughter Marge (Kathy Fields) is scared by Mary's call, as it reminds her of the time she had found her mother unconscious after an overdose.

En route to Nassau, Mary meets Flo (Shirley Jones), an old college friend she has not seen since 1953. While Mary settled down to married life, Flo has been the mistress of a series of married men, lives a rather carefree and hedonistic lifestyle, and has fully embraced the sexual revolution. She is on her way to Nassau to meet her latest beau, Sam (Lloyd Bridges). Mary tells her she has had to get away from Fred, so Flo promises to look after her.

In the Bahamas, Mary enjoys the sun and long, empty stretches of beach. At a casino, she meets Franco (Bobby Darin), a hustler from Los Angeles who is down on his luck. Franco mistakenly assumes that Mary is wealthy. He affects an Italian accent and tells Mary he is a journalist who writes about film stars. She agrees to go to "his" boat, but when he learns Mary is not wealthy, Franco quickly loses interest, confessing his scam.

Walking by the ocean, Mary recalls the occasion of her suicide attempt — she had returned from having a face lift to learn that Fred was in Reno with a girl. Marge had found her in danger of death and rushed her to hospital. After that, Mary resumed drinking, recklessly spent a lot of money, and crashed her car while driving drunk.

In the present, Sam proposes to Flo, who accepts. Mary flies back home. Agnes helps her move into rooms she has rented away from Fred and Marge. She takes a job and enrolls in night classes at the university. It is at the college where Fred finds Mary one evening. He asks, "What went wrong? All our friends are married, and they're happy...or seem to be. Alright, they put up with it. But without marriage, life would be disorganized, crazy." Her reply: "People in love are crazy." They tell one another they still love each other, but "it's not enough," she says. After some more conversation as he walks her toward the university entrance, she asks, "If we were not married, would you marry me again?" The look on his face and lack of an affirmative answer says it all.

Cast

 Jean Simmons as Mary Wilson
 John Forsythe as Fred Wilson
 Shirley Jones as Flo Harrigan
 Lloyd Bridges as Sam
 Teresa Wright as Mrs. Spencer
 Dick Shawn as Harry Bricker
 Nanette Fabray as Agnes
 Bobby Darin as Franco (credited as "Robert Darin")
 Tina Louise as Helen Bricker
 Kathy Fields as Marge Wilson
 Karen Steele as Divorcee
 Gail Hensley as Betty
 Eve Brent as Ethel
 William O'Connell as Minister
 Barry Cahill as Handsome Man
 Miriam Blake as Cindy
 John Gallaudet as Airplane Passenger (uncredited)
 Erin Moran as Marge Wilson as a Child (uncredited)
 Nanci Roberts as Model (uncredited)

Production
The film was rated 'M' certificate, and has a running time of 112 minutes.

Music for the film was composed and conducted by Michel Legrand, the song lyrics by Alan Bergman and Marilyn Bergman. The soundtrack performance of "What Are You Doing the Rest of Your Life?" was sung by Michael Dees and the soundtrack songs "Hurry Up 'N Hurry Down" and "Something for Everybody" were performed by William Eaton. The film was nominated for Academy Awards for Best Actress in a Leading Role (Jean Simmons) and Best Music, Song (Michel Legrand, Alan Bergman, and Marilyn Bergman for "What Are You Doing the Rest of Your Life?"). The song was one of the eight pieces of music chosen by Jean Simmons when she appeared on the BBC radio program Desert Island Discs on  11 August 1975.

Awards and nominations

See also
 List of American films of 1969

References

External links
 
 
 

1969 films
Adultery in films
American psychological drama films
1960s English-language films
1960s feminist films
Films about suicide
Films directed by Richard Brooks
Films scored by Michel Legrand
Films set in 1953
Films set in 1969
Films set in Colorado
Films set in the Bahamas
United Artists films
1960s psychological drama films
1969 drama films
1960s American films